Alice Egerton may refer to:

Alice Egerton, Countess of Brackley (1559–1637), English noblewoman
Alice Vaughan, Countess of Carbery (1619–1689), formerly Alice Egerton
Lady Alice Egerton (1923–1977), British noblewoman